Saint-Patrice-de-Sherrington is a municipality in Les Jardins-de-Napierville Regional County Municipality in Quebec, Canada, situated in the Montérégie administrative region. The population as of the Canada 2011 Census was 1,971.

Demographics

Population

Language

Education

The South Shore Protestant Regional School Board previously served the municipality.

See also
Les Jardins-de-Napierville Regional County Municipality
Rivière de la Tortue (Delson)
List of municipalities in Quebec

References

Incorporated places in Les Jardins-de-Napierville Regional County Municipality
Municipalities in Quebec